66/67: Fairplay Is Over is a 2009 German drama film directed by Carsten Ludwig and Jan-Christoph Glaser. The film tells the story of a group of hooligans of the German football club Eintracht Braunschweig.

External links

References

2009 films
2000s German-language films
Films shot in Braunschweig
German association football films
2000s sports drama films
Eintracht Braunschweig
2009 drama films
2000s German films